Jemma McKenzie-Brown (born 2 June 1994) is an English actress and singer. She is known for her role as Tiara Gold in the 2008 film High School Musical 3: Senior Year.

Life and career
Born in Beverley, East Riding of Yorkshire, she attended the Pamela Gray Dancing Academy in Hull. Having auditioned and subsequently gained a place at the Sylvia Young Theatre School, McKenzie-Brown relocated from Hull's Hymers College to lodge with a guest family in London, aged 11. As of 2010, McKenzie-Brown graduated from the Sylvia Young Theatre School. Her father , Carl McKenzie-Brown retired from BAE Systems in 2019.

Through the school's theatrical agency, McKenzie-Brown started to appear in various shows. In 2006, she made her debut playing Georgina Pritchard in the short television series The Amazing Mrs. Pritchard, portraying the daughter of Jane Horrocks' character. In 2008, she made a guest appearance on children's television series, M.I. High as Irene in the episode "Spy Plane". She then lent her voice to radio plays, including a production of the Arthur Ransome version of Old Peter's Russian Tales, and The Monstrous Mother.

In 2008, she took part in a closed audition in London and Los Angeles for the role of Tiara Gold in High School Musical 3: Senior Year. After gaining the role and filming in Salt Lake City, Utah, she generated much worldwide fame. On 14 September 2009, McKenzie-Brown stated she would not be returning in the fourth installment of High School Musical.

On 13 November 2020 McKenzie-Brown's band, About Bunny, released their debut single "Special".

Filmography

Discography

Soundtrack albums
2008: High School Musical 3: Senior Year

References

External links

1994 births
Living people
21st-century English actresses
Alumni of the Sylvia Young Theatre School
English child actresses
English film actresses
English radio actresses
English television actresses
People educated at Hymers College
People from Beverley